Bistro is a type of restaurant.

Bistro may also refer to:
 2038 Bistro, an asteroid named after the restaurant
 "Bistro," a song by Madvillain from his album Madvillainy
 Bistro, Novi Travnik, a village in Bosnia and Herzegovina
 Bistro filet or shoulder tender, a cut of beef
 An abbreviation for BSD distribution, that is an operating system descended from BSD, e.g. FreeBSD.